The first season of the television series Dollhouse, premiered on February 13, 2009, on Fox and concluded its 12-episode season on May 8, 2009. The season aired on Fridays at 9:00 pm ET. Together with Fringe, Dollhouse was a part of Fox's "Remote-Free TV" initiative to keep people from switching channels during commercial breaks. Therefore, every episode of this season was 47–50 minutes long compared to a usual 40–43 minute length for regular network television.

Cast and characters

Main cast 
 Eliza Dushku as Echo/Caroline Farrell
 Harry Lennix as Boyd Langton
 Fran Kranz as Topher Brink
 Tahmoh Penikett as Paul Ballard
 Enver Gjokaj as Victor/Anthony Ceccoli
 Dichen Lachman as Sierra/Priya Tsetsang (Does not appear in "The Target")
 Olivia Williams as Adelle DeWitt

Recurring cast 
 Amy Acker as Dr. Claire Saunders/Whiskey (11 episodes; including unaired pilot)
 Reed Diamond as Laurence Dominic (10 episodes; including unaired pilot)
 Miracle Laurie as Mellie/November/Madelaine Costley (10 episodes)
 Aisha Hinds as Agent Loomis (5 episodes; including unaired pilot)
 Liza Lapira as Ivy (4 episodes)
 Mark Sheppard as Agent Graham Tanaka (3 episodes)
 Brett Claywell as Matt Cargill (2 episodes)
 Kevin Kilner as Joe Hearn (2 episodes)
 Patton Oswalt as Joel Mynor (1 episode)
 Alan Tudyk as Alpha (2 episodes)
 Philip Casnoff as Clive Ambrose (1 episode)
 Felicia Day as Mag (1 episode)
 Adair Tishler as Iris/Little Caroline (1 episode)
 Vincent Ventresca as Nolan Kinnard (1 episode)
 Zack Ward as Zone (1 episode)

Episodes

Production 
The episode "Echo" was originally intended to be the on-air series pilot, but after test audiences found it "too confusing and dark", Joss Whedon decided to shoot a new pilot, "Ghost", to better introduce the story and characters to the viewing audience. It was originally reported that "Echo" was going to be aired second, after "Ghost", but when it proved impossible to salvage (even after reshoots), Whedon decided to shelve the episode completely and instead re-used footage from it for inclusion in later episodes. The episode has a different opening with Echo in multiple assignments from overseeing a criminal deal to helping a girl go into rehab. One major change is the revelation of Victor being an Active took place in the pilot rather than put off as in the original episode run, as well as Ballard's first encounter with Echo. Two actresses in this episode are featured later in the series as different characters—Ashley Johnson as Wendy/Caroline in "Omega" and Stacey Scowley as Cindy Perrin in season 2. It was included on the DVD and Blu-ray season sets released on July 28, 2009.

This mix up during production created a problem for 20th Century Fox who required a thirteen episode order for overseas markets and home release. Whedon approached Fox with an idea to produce a thirteenth episode for half the price of a standard episode and that he would shoot it with a "run and gun crew" during production of the 12th episode and official finale "Omega". Such constraints made it necessary to hire the crew from 24 (another Fox series) as well as its director of photography, Rodney Charters. The episode features the series' cast minimally and instead focuses on a group of unknown "actuals" who are trying to escape the apocalypse. This episode became "Epitaph One" which was set ten years in the future where the imprinting technology had fallen out of Rossum's control and destroyed civilization. Anticipation for the episode was high but Fox decided not to air the episode against Whedon's request and it was therefore never shown in the US. The episode was instead screened at San Diego Comic-Con International on July 24, 2009.

Crew 
Series creator Joss Whedon served as executive producer alongside writing duo Elizabeth Craft and Sarah Fain who ran the series with Whedon and served as co-executive producers, they originally worked with him on the final two seasons of Angel. Whedon wrote and directed two episodes—the unaired pilot and the series premiere—and wrote "Man on the Street" and provided the story for "Epitaph One". Tim Minear, who had worked on both Angel and Firefly in prominent roles, came on as consulting producer from the beginning and wrote two episodes ("True Believer" and "Omega") and subsequently directed "Omega." The writing staff also included consulting producer Steven S. DeKnight who wrote and directed "The Target" before leaving the show to produce Spartacus: Blood and Sand. Jane Espenson (another Whedon veteran) replaced DeKnight as consulting producer and co-wrote "Haunted" and wrote "Briar Rose". The writers room was rounded out with staff writers; Andrew Chambliss, who wrote "Spy in the House of Love"; Tracey Bellomo, who wrote "Needs"; and husband-wife team Maurissa Tancharoen and Jed Whedon who wrote "Stage Fright", "Haunted" (with Jane Espenson) and "Epitaph One" from a story by Whedon. Elizabeth Craft and Sarah Fain wrote the remaining episodes; "Gray Hour" and "Echoes". 

Veteran Buffy director David Solomon (also co-executive producer) directed the highest number of episodes in the first season, directing three out of the thirteen including "Epitaph One". Joss Whedon directed two, one of which did not air but footage was used and placed in a variety of episodes. Other directors included Allan Kroeker, Rod Hardy, Elodie Keene, David Straiton, James Contner, Felix Alcalá and Dwight Little.

As well as starring in the show, Eliza Dushku acted as producer throughout the series' run while Kelly A. Manners (who also worked on Angel) acted as line producer for the show.

Home video releases 
Dollhouse: Season One was released on DVD and Blu-ray in region 1 on July 28, 2009. In region 2, it was released on DVD on September 7, 2009 and on Blu-ray on October 11, 2010 along with the release of season 2. It includes all 13 episodes, including the unaired episode "Epitaph One" and the original unaired pilot "Echo". Special features include three commentary tracks—"Ghost" by Joss Whedon and Eliza Dushku; "Man on the Street" by Joss Whedon; and "Epitaph One" by Maurissa Tancharoen and Jed Whedon. Featurettes include, "Making Dollhouse", a behind-the-scenes look at the production; "Coming Back Home", which details the various cast and crew who worked with Joss Whedon previously; "Finding Echo", an interview with actress Eliza Dushku; "Designing the Perfect Dollhouse", a tour of the Dollhouse set with Joss Whedon; and "A Private Engagement", where cast and crew talk about the technology invented for the show. Also included are deleted scenes from various episodes.

The season one DVD sold over 62,000 copies in the first week, and made over 1.8 million dollars.

References

External links 
 
 

2009 American television seasons